The vastness of Canada's Northwest Territories (spelled 'North-West Territories' from 1870 to 1906) meant that for much of its history it was divided into several districts for ease of administration. The number and size of these territorial districts varied as other provinces and territories of Canada were created and expanded.  The districts of the Northwest Territories were abolished in 1999 with the creation of the Nunavut territory and the contraction of the Northwest Territories to its current size.

North-West Territories pre-'districts'
The North-West Territories were administered as a single entity, with no districts, from 1870 to 1882.

In 1870 Canada gained control of Rupert's Land and the North-Western Territory from the Hudson's Bay Company. That same year, a small piece of Rupert's Land was formed into the province of Manitoba, but the rest of the area was merged and renamed the North-West Territories. This region included the vast bulk of Canada's present day landmass and covered an area about the size of western Europe.

This autonomous territory is not to be confused with the 'districts' which would later be created within the North-West Territories.

In 1880 the Canadian Arctic Archipelago was ceded to Canada by the United Kingdom and this land was added to the North-West Territories.

Time line

1882

As the southern part of the North-West Territories became populated, four districts were created in 1882 for ease of administration; unlike Keewatin, these areas remained a part of the North-West Territories, and thus were formally called provisional districts:
The District of Alberta was where the southwestern part of the province of Alberta is today, east of British Columbia, west of the line between ranges 10 and 11 of the Dominion Land Survey (about 112° west) and north of the Canada–US border.
The District of Athabasca covered the northern half of what is today Alberta.
The District of Assiniboia was where the southernmost quarter of Saskatchewan is today (south of the Ninth Correction Line, about 51.97° north), but stretched somewhat further west into what is today Alberta.
The District of Saskatchewan was to the north of Assiniboia extending halfway up modern Saskatchewan (18th Correction Line, about 55.11° north). It stretched further east than Assiniboia, running all the way to the shore of Lake Winnipeg and the Nelson River. It also stretched west into what is now Alberta.

1895

In 1895 the northern portion of the North-West Territories was divided into four more internal districts for ease of administration:
The District of Franklin was made up of the Arctic islands.
The District of Ungava was made up of what is today northern Quebec, parts of Labrador, and offshore islands (in Hudson, James and Ungava Bays) that are today part of Nunavut.
The District of Yukon was made up of what is today the Yukon.
The District of Mackenzie was the rest, stretching from the Yukon border in the west to the Keewatin border in the east, and containing none of the islands.
The District of Athabasca expanded and covered the northern half of what is today both Alberta and Saskatchewan.

1898
The North-West Territories shrunk in 1898 when the Klondike Gold Rush necessitated the conversion of the District of Yukon into the autonomous Yukon Territory.  As well, the southernmost part of Ungava was ceded to Quebec.

1901
A minor boundary adjustment was made, as a small portion of land in the northwestern portion of Mackenzie District was ceded to the Yukon Territory.

1905-06
The North-West Territories experienced significant adjustments between 1905 and 1906:

The Districts of Alberta, Assiniboia, Athabasca, and Saskatchewan were reorganized to form the provinces of Alberta and Saskatchewan (1905).
The original independent territory 'District of Keewatin', which had shrunk considerably from its 1876 size as large portions of its area had been converted into the expansion of Manitoba and Ontario, gave up its autonomy and became a district within the North-West Territories (1906).
A small eastern portion of the (now) defunct Districts of Saskatchewan and Athabaska were added to the District of Keewatin.
A portion of the District of Mackenzie was added to the District of Keewatin.
The hyphen was removed from North-West Territories, so that the area was now named the Northwest Territories (1906).
The Northwest Territories now consisted of the Districts of Franklin, Ungava, Mackenzie and Keewatin.

1912
The Northwest Territories experienced further attrition in 1912:
The entire continental portion of the District of Ungava was converted into the northern expansion of the province of Quebec.  Only the district's more than 1500 almost entirely uninhabited offshore islands remained part of the Northwest Territories; they were made a part of the Franklin District in 1920.
Most of the District of Keewatin (i.e., everything south of 60 degrees north) was converted into the northern expansion of the provinces of Ontario and Manitoba.

The Northwest Territories now consisted of the Districts of Franklin, Mackenzie and Keewatin. Ungava remained a district until 1920, but with no population to administer, this district designation was effectively unused after 1912.

The three remaining districts continued to be used for a number of decades, but as control over the territory was moved from departments of the federal government to a centralized government in Yellowknife starting in 1967, they began to have far less use. Although the Districts of Franklin, Mackenzie and Keewatin continued to appear on many maps (and continued to exist), by the 1980s the practical governance of the Northwest Territories was divided into four administrative regions: Inuvik, Fort Smith, Keewatin and Baffin. A fifth region, the Central Arctic Region and subsequently called the Kitikmeot, was later carved out of the Fort Smith Region.

1999
In 1999 the Northwest Territories was reduced to its current size - and the notion of the 'districts' was abolished - with the creation of the territory of Nunavut.  The former District of Keewatin, most of the Arctic Islands of the District of Franklin, and a northeast portion of the District of Mackenzie now form Nunavut, with the remainder of Franklin and the majority of Mackenzie forming the current version of the Northwest Territories.

See also
Former colonies and territories in Canada
Territorial evolution of Canada
Politics of Northwest Territories
History of the Northwest Territories
History of Northwest Territories capital cities
Council of Keewatin
List of Northwest Territories Legislative Assemblies

Notes

External links
A map of the districts of the Northwest Territories
NWT Historical Timeline
History of the name of the Northwest Territories

 
1882 in Canada
Former subdivisions of Canada